Events in the year 1880 in Portugal.

Incumbents
Monarch: Louis I
Prime Minister: Anselmo José Braamcamp

Events

Arts and entertainment

Sports
S.U. 1º de Dezembro founded

Births

8 July – Branca de Gonta Colaço, writer, scholar and linguist (d. 1945)

29 September – Liberato Pinto, politician (died 1949)

Full date missing 
Fernando Correia, fencer.

Deaths

References

 
Portugal
1880s in Portugal
Years of the 19th century in Portugal